Amir Abedini (born Hassan Abedini on 13 December 1949) is an Iranian politician, football club chairman, former professional footballer and member of the City Council of Tehran.

Political career 
During 1980s, he held office as governor of three provinces under Government of Mir-Hossein Mousavi (1981–89). Abedini is a self-described "Mousavi[-like] left-winger" politician. In 1997, he endorsed Ali Akbar Nategh-Nouri for president.

Sport career 
Abedini played for Persepolis and Paykan in the 1960s.

He was the chairman of the Persepolis Athletic and Cultural Club between 1993 and 2001. Currently he is chairman of the club Damash Iranian and Damash Gilan.

References

Presidents of Iranian Football Federation
Persepolis F.C. players
Iranian businesspeople
Iranian football chairmen and investors
Living people
Governors of East Azerbaijan Province
Tehran Councillors 1999–2003
1949 births
Iranian sportsperson-politicians

Association footballers not categorized by position
Iranian footballers